Challa Jewish Neo-Aramaic was a dialect of Northeastern Neo-Aramaic formerly spoken by Jews in Çukurca (Tyari).

Phonology

References

Hakkâri Province
Extinct languages of Asia
Jewish Northeastern Neo-Aramaic dialects